Yamamoto is a Japanese surname.

Yamamoto may also refer to:

Places
Yamamoto, Kagawa
Yamamoto, Miyagi
Yamamoto, Akita
Yamamoto District, Akita

Other uses 
Yamamoto (crater)

See also
 Lubell–Yamamoto–Meshalkin inequality, in mathematics
 Yamoto (disambiguation)